Francis Cagigao Souto (born 11 November 1969) is an English–Spanish football scout and coach and former player and currently serves as the Sports Director of the Football Federation of Chile. He played for Arsenal, where he won the FA Youth Cup in 1988 under Pat Rice, Barcelona B, Racing de Santander, Southend United, Racing de Ferrol and Yeclano Deportivo in the second tier. A Spanish u19/20 International, his career was cut short at the age of 29 due to injury. He coached Club Lemos to the Segunda División B play-offs in Spain.

Career
He is respected worldwide as Arsenal's longest serving senior scout with over 23 years at the club and has been Head of International Scouting for several years with expertise and a network mainly in Europe and South America.

The trilingual Cagigao worked under Arsène Wenger for 21 years, followed by Unai Emery and Mikel Arteta. He has close ties with the Spanish FA where he has served as an instructor on the Director of Football course.

He was responsible for direct participation in the signings of players such as Lauren, Cesc Fabregas, Jose Antonio Reyes, Santi Cazorla, Nacho Monreal, Mikel Arteta, Emiliano Martinez, Granit Xhaka, Alexis, Carlos Vela, Hector Bellerin, Robin van Persie and others alongside Steve Rowley, ex Chief Scout. More recently, he was involved in signing Gabriel Martinelli and William Saliba.

In 2020, he became the Technical Director of the Football Federation of Chile. He also joined the Board of Directors of Canadian club 1812 FC Barrie.

Honours

Club
Arsenal
FA Youth Cup: 1988

References

External links
Francis Cagigao on Twitter

1969 births
Living people
People from Epping
English footballers
Association football midfielders
Arsenal F.C. players
FC Barcelona Atlètic players
Southend United F.C. players
Arsenal F.C. non-playing staff